Carousell is a Singaporean smartphone and web-based consumer to consumer and business to consumer marketplace for buying and selling new and secondhand goods. Headquartered in Singapore, it also operates in Malaysia, Indonesia, the Philippines, Cambodia, Taiwan, Hong Kong, Macau, Australia, New Zealand and Canada. Carousell is available on both iOS and Android devices.

History
Carousell was founded in Singapore on 14 May 2012, by co-founders Quek Siu Rui, Lucas Ngoo, and Marcus Tan. The first item sold on Carousell was an Amazon Kindle e-reader for S$75. Carousell was subsequently registered as Carousell Pte. Ltd. on 2 January 2013.

Carousell received its first investment from Quest Ventures. In November 2013, Rakuten, with follow-on investments by Golden Gate Ventures, 500 Global (previously 500 Startups), and a few other investors invested $1 million in Carousell. Subsequently, in November 2014, Carousell announced that it received US$6 million in investment from Sequoia India. In August 2016, Carousell raised $35 million in their Series B funding round by Rakuten Ventures, Sequoia India, Golden Gate Ventures, and 500 Global. In October 2016, Carousell acquired Singaporean mobile-first used car marketplace and dealership tool Caarly. A consortium led by South Korean Internet giant Naver has struck an investment deal with classifieds platform Carousell worth US$80 million. Following the deal, the Singapore-headquartered start-up will be valued at over US$900 million.

As of 2016, over 23 million items had been sold on Carousell and users had created over 57 million listings of new and used items for sale.

Carousell has expanded regionally to seven countries, including Australia, Hong Kong, Malaysia, Indonesia, and Taiwan. However, Carousell's expansion into Taiwan faces competition against headstart companies like Yahoo! and Ruten, which are already settled in the e-commerce market. In April 2019, Carousell acquired OLX Philippines after receiving an investment from Naspers.

The company raised $85 million Series C funding in May 2018. The round was co-led by existing investor Rakuten Ventures and EDBI. Other participants included 500 Global, Golden Gate Ventures and Sequoia India as well as new investor DBS.

On 21 November 2019, Carousell merged with Telenor's 701Search to creates a regional leader in online classifieds across 8 markets in Southeast Asia, Hong Kong and Taiwan. Mudah, Chotot and OneKyat which were owned by 701Search will retain their individual brands and platforms, continuing operations in Malaysia, Vietnam and Myanmar respectively following the merger.

In June 2021, Bloomberg reported that Carousell is planning a SPAC merger. In September 2021, Carousell announced that it had raised US$100 million in a round of funding led by South Korean private equity firm STIC Investments, bringing its valuation to US$1.1 billion.

Partnerships and collaborations

In January 2013, Singapore Press Holdings' ST Classifieds announced its collaboration with Carousell.

According to a Yahoo Finance article in August 2013, Carousell announced its partnership with Singapore Press Holdings (SPH) Magazines, a subsidiary of SPH, to create a mobile app called SheShops Marketplace, selling fashion and beauty items.

On 21 June 2018, Carousell announced its partnership with DBS Holdings, Stripe and VISA, to launch CarouPay, a mobile payment service. In 2019, Carousell revamped CarouPay to launch Carousell Protection. Carousell Protection is its secure in-app payment feature that allows buyer and seller to make payment and complete the deal on Carousell, through credit/debit card or DBS PayLah!. Some features include that the payment be held by Carousell until both buyer and seller are satisfied with the transaction, and that buyers and sellers are given a platform to raise and resolve issues with their order in the app.

In 2019, Carousell has merged with 701Search, the classifieds firm owned by Norwegian telco Telenor Group, lifting the value of the Singapore start-up to over US$850 million (S$1.16 billion) from US$560 million.

Operation
Items are prohibited for sale on Carousell if they are illegal or they violate the marketplace's community guidelines.

In the effort to curb COVID-19, Carousell has issued in-app advisories to refrain users from face-to-face transactions.

Carousell Media Group appointed a new head of ad operations in 2021.

Controversies
In a Yahoo Tumblr page, images of users posting photos or screenshots of their bad experiences they encounter on Carousell relating to scams, fraud and harassment have circulated on social media platforms like Facebook and Tumblr. Users of Carousell have also complained about cases of scams by fake sellers. The Singapore Police Force has reported that over 70% of e-commerce scams in 2018 took place on Carousell.

In October 2020, it was reported to the Health Sciences Authority that a long-banned weight-loss product was sold on Carousell and other e-commerce platforms.

References

External links
 

2012 establishments in Singapore
Online marketplaces of Singapore
Online retailers of Singapore
Singaporean brands
Retail companies established in 2012
Internet properties established in 2012
Singaporean companies established in 2012